SAS Saldanha is a South African Navy training base in Saldanha Bay.

History

In 1941, as a result of increased pressure on Table Bay, a new Allied harbour was sought. Saldanha Bay, with its sheltered moorings, was the ideal location.

The South African Seaward Defence Force and a minesweeping flotilla were established in 1942 for seaward and harbour protection. On Baviaanskop, Elands Bay, Malgaskop and Hoedjiespunt, 6-inch and 12-inch guns were installed. Anti-submarine nets were laid in North Bay, and eight lines of moored mines and a control centre on land protected the entrance of Saldanha Bay. Members of the South African Women's Auxiliary Naval Services, previously known as SWANS, manned the controls and detection equipment.

All the British living quarters became the property of the SA Navy on 14 June 1944. In 1948 the training establishment HMSAS Field Marshal Smuts moved from Saldanha to Salisbury island in Durban. However, the base at Saldanha soon reverted to a training base in 1951 when the Naval Gymnasium was set up with 44 trainees reporting for a year's training.

Before the unit was christened SAS Saldanha on 1 March 1956, it was known as the "Naval and Marine Gymnasium" and "SAS Drommedaris." With the implementation of 12 months compulsory National Service, SAS Saldanha started training recruits from both the National Service and the Permanent Force.

In May 1989 SAS Saldanha became a naval base with the added responsibility to still function as a unit. This was maintained until 1990 when, due to rationalisation, it reverted to a pure training unit.

Training Courses
The training that currently takes place at SAS Saldanha is divided into three parts:

 Military Skills Development (MSD) Training
 Military Training for Ratings Part 2 (MTR 2)- a requirement for Leading Seamen to become a Petty Officer
 Military Training for Ratings Part 3 (MTR 3) - needed for promotion to Warrant Officer

SA Navy also trains NARYSEC (YLDP - Youth Leadership Development Programme) participants, who are recruited by Department of Rural Development & Land Reform. In a year period of time, SAS Saldanha welcomes 2 or 3 intake, which consists of nearly one thousand (1 000) youth from across South Africa. These youth people receive leadership training through the military approach of training. West Coast College and Boland College with other stakeholders play a theorical role in developing the youth at SAS Saldanha.

References

http://www.ruraldevelopment.gov.za/about-us/narysec#.XFRO3YoaLIU

External links
 Creating a New Navy - ISS

See also
 South African Military Academy

Installations of the South African Navy